International Cars And Motors Ltd. (ICML) is an Indian automobile manufacturer of SUVs. ICML made the ICML Rhino and ICML Extreme, both of which are now out of production. It is a subsidiary of Sonalika Group.

Company history 
The company from Delhi belongs to the tractor manufacturer Sonalika Group and was founded in 2003. In 2006, the production of automobiles began. The brand name is International.

References

2003 establishments in Delhi
Vehicle manufacturing companies established in 2003
Indian companies established in 2003
Manufacturing companies based in Delhi